The Breiðablik women's football team is the women's football department of the Breiðablik UBK multi-sport club. It is based in Kópavogur, Iceland, and currently plays in the Úrvalsdeild kvenna, the top-tier women's football league in Iceland. They finished second in the league in 2017 and first in 2018.

They won the Úrvalsdeild kvenna  in 2020 and are currently competing in the 2021–22 UEFA Women's Champions League.

History
The women's football team is the powerhouse of Icelandic women's football and nearly made a clean sweep in 2005, winning the championship and cup plus almost all of the younger division titles.
In International competitions Breiðablik has taken part in The Nordic Open Championship in the years 1995, 1996 and 1997 among teams such as Fortuna Hjørring from Denmark, Trondheims Örn from Norway and HJK from Finland.

Breiðablik was the first Icelandic team to earn a seat in The European Women's Cup 2001–02 but due to financial reasons Breiðablik did not participate and KR was therefore the first Icelandic team to take part.
Breiðablik did however take part in the Women's Cup the following year where they played in group with the Danish Champions Fortuna Hjørring, Belarus Champions FC Babruyshanka and Moldovan Champions FC Codru Anenii Noi. There Breiðablik won Iceland's first win in the Women's Cup against FC Codru Anenii Noi.

In the Women's Cup 2006–07 Breiðablik qualified again and this time won their group with some differences. The team did not conceive a goal and scored 14 in the three matches. Their opponents were SV Neulengbach from Austria, SU 1° Dezembro from Portugal and Newtownabbey Strikers from Northern Ireland.
In the second qualifying round Breiðablik was very unlucky to have as an opponent the great team from Germany 1. FFC Frankfurt. It turned out the German team was too big for the Icelandic team but they did well and came in second with two wins, against HJK from Finland and Universitet Vitebsk from Belarus and qualified to the quarter finals.
In the quarterfinals in 2006–2007 competition Breiðablik played home and away matches against the team that later won the competition Arsenal Ladies FC from England. No need to say Arsenal was way better team but Breiðablik could still walk strong and hold their head up high.

The third time Breiðablik qualified to the European Women's Cup the name of the Competition had been changed to UEFA Women's Champion League and the season was 2010–11.
Breiðablik came in as a second Icelandic team to the competition and had to play in the Qualifying round, group 4 along with FCF Juvisy Essonne from France, FC Targu Mures from Romania and FC Levadia Tallinn from Estonia. Breiðablik came in second in the qualifying round with 7 points like FCF Juvisy and was one of two teams to qualify to the main round of 32 teams.

In 2015, the team won the Icelandic championship for the sixteenth time.

On 17 August 2018, Breiðablik won the Icelandic Cup for the 12th time, defeating Stjarnan 2-1 in the Cup finals.

On 17 September 2018, Breiðablik won the Icelandic championship for the seventeenth time.

Current squad

Honours

League
 Úrvalsdeild kvenna (Premier league)
 Winners (18): 1977, 1979, 1980, 1981, 1982, 1983, 1990, 1991, 1992, 1994, 1995, 1996, 2000, 2001, 2005, 2015, 2018, 2020
 1. deild kvenna (1st division)
 Winners (1): 1988

Cups
 Icelandic Cup
 Winners (13): 1981, 1982, 1983, 1994, 1996, 1997, 1998, 2000, 2005, 2013, 2016, 2018, 2021
 Icelandic League Cup
 Winners (7): 1996, 1997, 1998, 2001, 2006, 2012, 2019

European record
 note that qualifying rounds are a round-robin tournament of one game each against three opponents in the group, rather than a two-game aggregate against a single opponent

References

External links
Official site

Football clubs in Iceland
Sport in Kópavogur
Women's football clubs in Iceland
Capital Region (Iceland)
Úrvalsdeild Women clubs